The Right Time is the first album by Swedish pop singer Bosson. It was released in 1998 under MNW and BAM.

Track listing

Singles
Baby Don't Cry
Baby Don't Cry (Radio Edit)
Baby Don't Cry (Extended Version)
Baby Don't Cry (Da Bump Remix)
Baby Don't Cry (Hard House Dub)

We Live
We Live (Radio Mix)
We Live (Album Mix)
We Live (Extended Album Mix)
We Live (Engines Garage Mix)

Right Time
Right Time
Right Time (Extended)
Right Time (Random Plaztic Mix, Short Version)
Right Time (Random Plaztic Mix, Long Version)

1998 debut albums
Bosson albums

sv:The Right Time